Optimized Systems and Solutions LLC (formerly known as Data Systems & Solutions) is a wholly owned subsidiary of Rolls-Royce plc, with offices in the US, UK, France and the Czech Republic.  It was founded in 1999 as a joint venture between Rolls-Royce plc and Science Applications International Corporation (SAIC).  In early 2006, SAIC exited the joint venture agreement, making Rolls-Royce plc the sole owner.

As of June 30, 2014 OSyS has merged with Aero Engine Controls (AEC), another subsidiary of Rolls-Royce, and changed its name to Rolls-Royce Controls and Data Services.

Optimized Systems and Solutions specializes in the delivery of decision-support systems to monitor and optimize high-value assets in the following markets:

 oil and gas,
 civil and defence aerospace,
 power generation,
 marine,
 nuclear,
 transport (road and rail).

Markets, products and services 

OSyS provides commercial off-the-shelf (COTS) products and associated support services which are intended to enable businesses in these markets to:

 increase availability and reliability of key assets,
 reduce in-service cost,
 reduce risk through enhanced compliance and protection.

Such assets include gas turbines, diesel engines, pumps, compressors and rail transport systems.

Integrated solutions provided by OSyS include:

 data acquisition and management,
 electronic flight bag EFB,
 enterprise asset management,
 compliance,
 equipment health monitoring (EHM),
 fuel optimization,
 fleet planning and forecasting,
 decision support,
 systems integration and high-integrity software.

OSyS also provides consultancy services in regulatory compliance and environmental health and safety.

OSyS solutions and services are claimed to translate data directly into actionable information surrounding a customer's high-value assets.

Accreditation 
The Quality Management System (QMS) of Optimized Systems and Solutions LLC, has been approved by Lloyd's Register Quality Assurance to ISO 9001:2000.

References

External links

Companies based in Reston, Virginia
Software companies established in 1999
1999 establishments in Virginia